Bubble boy, boy in the bubble or boy in the plastic bubble may refer to:

 Severe combined immunodeficiency (also bubble boy disease), a rare genetic disorder characterized by the disturbed development of functional T cells and B cells
 David Vetter (1971–1984; also "the bubble boy"), American who was a prominent sufferer of severe combined immunodeficiency who was forced to live in a sterile room
 Ted DeVita (1962–1980), a prominent sufferer of severe aplastic anaemia who was also forced to live in a sterile hospital room

Arts
 "The Boy in the Bubble", a song by the American singer-songwriter Paul Simon
 The Boy in the Bubble, a 1994 Red House Children's Book Award-winning book by Ian Strachan
 The Boy in the Plastic Bubble, a 1976 American made for television drama film inspired by the lives of David Vetter and Ted DeVita
 Bubble Boy (film), a 2001 American comedy film directed by Blair Hayes
 Bubble Boy (musical), a musical with music and lyrics by Cinco Paul
 "The Bubble Boy" (Seinfeld), the 47th episode of the American sitcom Seinfeld
 "Lying Around the House / Bubble Boy", the 60th episode of the American superhero animated television series The Powerpuff Girls